Nasi pad prik is a Malaysian dish of fried rice flavoured with sauteed chilli paste. Nasi is Malay for rice and pad prik is a Thai phrase ผัดพริก where pad means stirfry and prik means chili. Although Nasi Pad Prik today is regarded as part of Malay cuisine, it is Thai in origin.

See also 

 Malaysian cuisine
 Fried rice
 Nuea phat phrik
 Phat phrik khing

External links 

 A recipe for nasi paprik (Malay)
 A blog about nasi paprik

Malaysian rice dishes
Malay words and phrases